Gábor Bányai (born 27 August 1969) is a Hungarian politician, member of the National Assembly (MP) for Bácsalmás, Bács-Kiskun County from 2006 to 2014, later for Kiskunhalas since 2014. He was a member of the Committee on Sustainable Development since 14 May 2010. He was appointed vice-chairman of the Enterprise Development Committee in May 2014.

He served as President of the General Assembly of Bács-Kiskun County from 2006 to 2014. Minister Tibor Navracsics appointed him government commissioner responsible for the economic development of the Southern Great Plain in May 2022.

Personal life
He is married. His wife is Krisztina Bányainé Móricz. They have five children - three daughters, Eszter, Krisztina and Anna and two sons, Áron and Gábor.

References

1969 births
Living people
Fidesz politicians
Members of the National Assembly of Hungary (2006–2010)
Members of the National Assembly of Hungary (2010–2014)
Members of the National Assembly of Hungary (2014–2018)
Members of the National Assembly of Hungary (2018–2022)
Members of the National Assembly of Hungary (2022–2026)
Politicians from Budapest